Tjama Tjivikua (born 27 July 1958) is a Namibian academic and businessman. He was the Rector of the Polytechnic of Namibia in Windhoek since its inception in 1995. When the institution was renamed into Namibia University of Science and Technology in 2015, Tjivikua continued to lead it, now in the position of vice-chancellor, until March 2019.

Education and early life
Tjivikua was born on 27 July 1958 in Otjomupanda, Otjozondjupa Region. His mother was a nurse and his father a school teacher. He grew up in Oruua in the then Ovitoto Reserve, and started primary school in 1967 at St Barnabas Anglican Church School in Windhoek's Old Location. His family soon moved to Katutura as a result of the forced removal of blacks from Old Location, and he continued his schooling there. After completing high school at Windhoek's Augustineum (1976–1978), Tjivikua worked at the main branch of Barclays Bank (now First National Bank) in Windhoek.

Tjivikua left Namibia in June 1979 to study chemistry in the United States at Rockland Community College (1979–1980) and then Lincoln University (1980–1983), from which he graduated cum laude. He then completed a MSc at University of Lowell and a PhD at University of Pittsburgh and Massachusetts Institute of Technology. His thesis was on molecular recognition in organic chemistry. He was a well recognized researcher at that time, and he worked as assistant professor of chemistry at Lincoln University from 1990 to 1995.

Professional career
In 1995, Tjivikua returned to Namibia to take up the post as founding Rector of Polytechnic of Namibia. When the institution was renamed into Namibia University of Science and Technology in 2015, Tjivikua continued to lead it, now in the position of vice-chancellor, until March 2019. Morne du Toit and Andrew Niikondo were successively appointed in acting position until Erold Naomab was appointed in 2021.

Tjivikua has also served on national bodies such as the National Planning Commission (1998–2006), the Namibia Qualifications Authority (1997–), the Namibia Council for Higher Education (2006–) and several others. He has several business interests, including finance, agriculture, and oil.

Awards
Heroes' Day 2014: Most Distinguished Order of Namibia: Second Class
2013: Doctor of Humane Letters (Honoris Causa), Lincoln University (Pennsylvania)
 2008: Bank Windhoek Business Communicator of the Year
 2006: FinWeek recognition as one of the 10 most prominent and respected members of the Namibian society
 2006: D.Sc (Honoris Causa) for exceptional contributions to the development of higher education in Namibia, Worcester Polytechnic Institute (WPI), USA
 2005: Life Fellow, Centres for Leadership and Public Values, University of Cape Town and Duke University
 1985: Outstanding Young Man of America
 1983: American Chemical Society Award, Lincoln University

References

External links
 
 
 
 
 
 

1958 births
Living people
People from Otjozondjupa Region
Lincoln University (Pennsylvania) alumni
University of Pittsburgh alumni
Massachusetts Institute of Technology alumni
University of Massachusetts Lowell alumni
Augustineum Secondary School alumni
Academic staff of the Namibia University of Science and Technology